John Bowden Anderton (28 December 1929 – 24 May 1991) was a South African sprinter. He competed in the men's 400 metres at the 1952 Summer Olympics.

References

External links
 

1929 births
1991 deaths
Athletes (track and field) at the 1952 Summer Olympics
South African male sprinters
Olympic athletes of South Africa
Sportspeople from Cape Town